The 2016 Franken Challenge is a professional tennis tournament, played on clay courts. It is the 29th edition of the tournament which is part of the 2016 ATP Challenger Tour. It takes place in Fürth, Germany between 30 May and 5 June 2016.

Singles main-draw entrants

Seeds

 1 Rankings as of May 23, 2016.

Other entrants
The following players received wildcards into the singles main draw:
  Matthias Bachinger
  Maximilian Marterer
  Daniel Masur
  Paul Wörner

The following player received entry as a protected ranking into the singles main draw:
  Julian Reister

The following player received entry as an alternate into the singles main draw:
  Henri Laaksonen

The following players received entry from the qualifying draw:
  Blaž Rola
  Arthur De Greef
  Caio Zampieri
  Lorenzo Sonego

The following player received entry as a lucky loser:
  Dennis Novak

Champions

Singles

  Radu Albot def.  Jan-Lennard Struff, 6–3, 6–4

Doubles

  Facundo Argüello /  Roberto Maytín def.  Andrej Martin /  Tristan-Samuel Weissborn, 6–3, 6–4

External links
Official Website

Franken Challenge
Franken Challenge
Franken Challenge
Franken Challenge
Franken Challenge